Leigh is both an English surname and a unisex given name meaning "meadow" and "delicate".

Surname
 Alex Leigh (born 1978), English fashion model
 Augusta Leigh (1783–1851), only daughter of John "Mad Jack" Byron
 Benjamin W. Leigh (1781–1849), American lawyer and politician from Richmond, Virginia
 Carol Leigh (1951-2022), American writer and activist
 Carolyn Leigh (1926–1983), American lyricist and composer for Broadway and movies
 Cherami Leigh (born 1988), American actress and voice actress
 Chyler Leigh (born 1982), American actress
 Danni Leigh (born 1970), American honky tonk-style country music singer
 Dorian Leigh (1917–2008), one of the world's first supermodels
 Dorothy Leigh (?-c.1616), British writer
 Ed Leigh (born 1975), British television presenter
 Edward Leigh (born 1950), politician in the United Kingdom
 Edward Chandos Leigh (1832–1915), English cricketer
 Fred W. Leigh (1871–1924), English lyricist of music hall songs
 Geoff Leigh (born 1945), English musician
 Gustavo Leigh (1920–1999), Chilean general
 Howard Leigh (born 1951), veteran boxing announcer from Melbourne, Australia
 Howard Leigh, Baron Leigh of Hurley (born 1959), British businessman and life peer
 Jack Leigh (1948–2004), photographer
 James Mathews Leigh (1808–1860), art educator, writer and dramatist
 Janet Leigh (1927–2004), American actress
 Jennifer Leigh (born 1983), professional poker player
 Jennifer Jason Leigh (born 1962), American actress
 John Leigh (actor) (born 1965), New Zealand actor
 Sir John Leigh, 1st Baronet (1884–1959), British mill-owner, newspaper-proprietor and Conservative Party politician
 Julia Leigh (born 1970), Australian novelist, film director and screenwriter
 Katie Leigh (born 1958), American voice actress
 Leigh Leigh (1975–1989), Australian  murder victim
 Lora Leigh (born 1965), romance novelist
 Margaret Leigh (1894–1973), English writer
 Margaret 'Molly' Leigh (1685–1748), accused of being a witch
 Megan Leigh (1964–1990), American actress
 Mercedes Leigh (b.1867 – ?), American actress
 Michael Leigh (disambiguation), several people
 Mike Leigh (born 1943), British screenwriter and director
 Mitch Leigh (1928–2014), musical theatre composer
 Nelson Leigh (1905–1985), American film actor
 Peter Leigh (born 1939), English footballer
 Robin Leigh-Pemberton, Baron Kingsdown (1926–2013), cross-bencher on the House of Lords
 Richard Leigh (author) (1943–2007), co-author of The Holy Blood and the Holy Grail
 Richard Leigh (martyr) (1561–1588), Catholic martyr
 Richard Leigh (poet) (1649/50–1728), English poet
 Richard Leigh (songwriter) (born 1951), American country music songwriter
 Roberta Leigh (1926–2014), British writer of romance fiction and children's stories
 Samuel Leigh (missionary) (1785–1852), British missionary to Australia and New Zealand
 Stephen Leigh (born 1951), American science fiction and fantasy writer
 Suzanna Leigh (1945–2017), British film actress
 Syd Leigh (1893–?), English professional footballer who played during the inter-war period
 Theophilus Leigh (died 1785), English academic administrator 
 Thomas Pemberton Leigh, 1st Baron Kingsdown (1793–1867), eldest son of Thomas Pemberton
 Trafford Leigh-Mallory (1892–1944), air chief marshal
 Vera Leigh (1903–1944), milliner who died in the Nazi concentration camp at Natzweiler
 Victoria Leigh Soto (1985–2012), teacher who died protecting her students during the Sandy Hook Elementary School shooting
 Vivien Leigh (1913–1967), British actress
 Walter Leigh (1905–1942), English composer

Given name
 Amee-Leigh Murphy Crowe (born 1995), Irish rugby sevens and union player
 Leigh Alexander (1898–1943), British army officer and cricketer
 Leigh Alexander (journalist) (born 1981), American author and journalist
 Leigh Daniel Avidan (born 1979), lead singer of Ninja Sex Party, Shadow Academy, and co-host of Game Grumps
 Leigh-Allyn Baker (born 1972), American actress 
 Leigh Bardugo (born 1975), American writer
Leigh Brackett (1915-1978), American science-fiction writer
 Leigh Broxham (born 1988), Australian footballer
 Leigh Davis (1955–2009), New Zealand-based writer
 Leigh Diffey (born 1971), Australian-American commentator
 Leigh Francis (born 1973), English comedian
 Leigh Griffiths (born 1990), Scottish footballer
 Leigh Halfpenny (born 1988), Welsh rugby union player
 Leigh Hart (born 1970), New Zealand comedian and radio show host
 Leigh Ann Hester (born 1982), American soldier and Silver Star recipient
 Leigh Hunt (born 1784, died 1859) English poet
 Leigh G. Kirkland (1873–1942), New York politician
 Leigh Lawson (born 1945), English actor and director
 Leigh Leigh (1975–1989), Australian murder victim
 Leigh McCloskey (born 1955), American actor
 Leigh Nash (born 1976), American singer-songwriter
 Leigh Ann Orsi (born 1981), American dancer and former actress 
 Leigh-Anne Pinnock (born 1991), Bajan and Jamaican singer-songwriter from Little Mix
 Leigh Rubin, American cartoonist (Rubes)
 Leigh Sales (born 1973), Australian author and journalist
 Leigh Taylor-Young (born 1945), American actress
 Leigh Whannell (born 1977), Australian screenwriter
 Leigh Wood, English boxer

Characters
 Amyas Leigh, fictional character from Charles Kingsley's novel Westward Ho!
 Sir Leigh Teabing, fictional character in the popular 2003 novel The Da Vinci Code and the 2006 film based on it
 Brenda Leigh Johnson, fictional character in the American television police procedural The Closer, played by Kyra Sedgwick 
Leigh Cabot, fictional character in the Stephen King novel Christine. 

English-language unisex given names
English-language surnames
English toponymic surnames